Richmond upon Thames College is a large college of further and higher education located on a single site in Twickenham. It provides education and training to 16- to 18-year-olds and adults from across the London Borough of Richmond upon Thames and further afield. The college offers a range of academic and technical vocational qualifications, including A Levels, technical vocational qualifications, higher education courses and apprenticeships. The college is since 2023 part of a newly merged group together with Harrow College and Uxbridge College.

History
The college was formed in 1977 by a merger of the sixth form colleges from Shene School and Thames Valley School with the former Twickenham College of Technology on its site. It was the first tertiary college established in Greater London.

A merger with Richmond Adult & Community College was proposed in 2003 but did not happen. In November 2020, Richmond upon Thames College announced a proposed merger with Harrow College & Uxbridge College (HCUC) that could be completed for autumn 2021 pending confirmation.

An £80 million redevelopment of the 22-acre campus kicked off in 2018. The first phase of the new campus was completed in spring 2020, and further new parts were scheduled to be  opened in 2021 and 2022.

A merger with Harrow College & Uxbridge College (HCUC) was confirmed in 2021. The new institution, Harrow, Richmond & Uxbridge Colleges (HRUC), was created on 4 January 2023.

Location
The college is situated in Twickenham, Greater London, a third of a mile from the English national rugby stadium. The nearest railway station is Twickenham and the nearest London Underground connections are Richmond and Hounslow Central. It is also served by London Buses routes, notably the 281 between Tolworth and Twickenham and the 267 between Fulwell and Hammersmith.

External inspections
The college received a "good" rating in all areas from Ofsted in its  November 2017 report.

Notable alumni
Caroline Flint (born 1961), Labour Party politician who served as Member of Parliament (MP) for Don Valley from 1997 to 2019.
Fionn Whitehead (born 1997), actor.
David Orobosa Omoregie (born 1998), musician.
Alan Mehdizadeh (born 1982), stage and screen actor.
James Cripps, musician and artist

Notes

1977 establishments in England
Educational institutions established in 1977
Education in the London Borough of Richmond upon Thames
Further education colleges in London
Twickenham